The men's 5000 metres event at the 1952 Olympic Games took place July 22 and July 24.  The final was won by Emil Zátopek of Czechoslovakia.

Results

Heats
The first round was on July 22. The fastest five runners from each heat qualified for the final.

Heat 1

Heat 2

Heat 3

Final

Key: DNF = Did not finish, OR = Olympic record

References

Athletics at the 1952 Summer Olympics
5000 metres at the Olympics
Men's events at the 1952 Summer Olympics